Savel may refer to
Mayres-Savel, a commune in the Isère department in southeastern France
Rimon-et-Savel, a commune in the Drôme department in southeastern France
Dava Savel, American television producer and writer
Savel Rădulescu (1885-1970), Romanian diplomat